Ridgeline High School may refer to:

Ridgeline High School (Utah)
Ridgeline High School (Washington)